Marcus Maecius Memmius Furius Baburius Caecilianus Placidus was a Roman statesman who served as Consul in 343 AD and as Praefectus urbi from 346 to 347 AD.

See also
 Maecia gens

Bibliography
 Potter, David Stone, The Roman Empire at Bay: Ad 180-395, Routledge, 2004, p. 476.

Imperial Roman consuls
Urban prefects of Rome

Year of birth unknown
Year of death unknown
4th-century Romans
Memmius Furius Baburius Caecilianus Placidus